Pakistan Federation of University Women (PFUW) is an organization based in Karachi, Pakistan. The organization promotes women education in Pakistan. It is part of Graduate Women International.

PFUW is known for publishing two magazines namely, Scintilla and Sayyarah. The organization also founded two colleges, one in North Nazimabad, Karachi and other one in Dhaka.

History
The organization was founded in 1950s by Zeenat Rashid Ahmed to promote education in the country.

In 2005, Zeenat Rashid Ahmed, the founder of PFUW died.

References

Graduate Women International
Organisations based in Karachi
1950s establishments in Pakistan